The Irish Law Reform Commission was established under section 3(1) of the Law Reform Commission Act 1975.

Activities 
The Commission an independent body which examines areas of the law and proposes reforms or changes. Most of their recommendations are adopted through legislation.

According to its website, 70% of its proposals have resulted in the enactment of legislation effecting reforms. The website says that the Commission is currently engaged in its Fifth Programme of Law Reform including the Statute Law Revision Programme.

Functions 
Section 4(1) of the Law Reform Commission Act 1975 provides:

By section 1, 
"the law" means the law of the State (including any private or public international law) and includes matters of legal practice or procedure, and "law" must be construed accordingly
"reform" includes, in relation to the law or a branch of the law, its development, its codification (including in particular its simplification and modernisation) and the revision and consolidation of statute law, and kindred words must be construed accordingly.

See also
Law commission

References

External links
 Law Reform Commission of Ireland

Law of the Republic of Ireland
1975 in law
1975 establishments in Ireland
Law commissions
Law reform in the Republic of Ireland